Eurygenium is an extinct genus of notoungulate belonging to the family Notohippidae. It lived during the Late Oligocene in what is today South America.

Description

It was a medium-sized mammal ; the best known species, Eurygenium pacegnum, was approximately 80 centimeters long and weighed 10 kilograms. Its body was relatively compact, with more robust legs than its relatives, such as Rhynchippus; unlike the latter, however, Eurygenium had tetradactyls forelegs and a third trochanter near the femoral midline. The skull of Eurygenium was characterized by a short and broad muzzle, with strong and laterally expanded zygomatic arches. The dentition was devoid of diastema. As in all Notohippidae, premolars and molars had a very high crown (hypsodont). The upper premolars lacked an anterolingual cingulum, while the posterolingual cingulum was reduced. The lower incisors cingulum was reduced or absent, while the lower premolars and molars had a dimple at the trigonid-talonid edge, but there was no dimple in the entolophid.

Classification

Eurygenium was a member of Notohippidae, a possibly paraphiletic family of toxodont notoungulates. Eurygenium was a basal representative of a derived group of Notohippids, comprising numerous forms such as Argyrohippus and Rhynchippus.

Eurygenium was first described in 1895 by Florentino Ameghino, based on fossilized remains found in terrains dated from the Late Oligocene in Argentine Patagonia. The type species is Eurygenium latirostris, but Ameghino described himself the species E. normalis, from the Late Oligocene of Patagonia. E. pacegnum was described in 1997, based on relatively well preserved specimens found in the Salla Formation, in Bolivia.

Bibliography
F. Ameghino. 1895. Première contribution à la connaissance de la faune mammalogique des couch à Pyrotherium. Boletín Instituto Geográfico Argentino 15: 603–660.
F. Ameghino. 1897. Mammiféres crétacés de l’Argentine (Deuxième contribution à la connaissance de la fauna mammalogique de couches à Pyrotherium). Boletin Instituto Geografico Argentino 18(4–9):406-521
B. J. Shockey. 1997. Two new notoungulates (Family Notohippidae) from the Salla Beds of Bolivia (Deseadan: Late Oligocene): systematics and functional morphology. Journal of Vertebrate Paleontology 17(3):584-599
H. Marani and M. T. Dozo. 2008. El cráneo más completo de Eurygenium latirostris Ameghino, 1895 (Mammalia, Notoungulata), un Notohippidae del Deseadense (Oligoceno Tardío) de la Patagonia, Argentina. Ameghiniana 45(3):619-626

Toxodonts
Oligocene mammals of South America
Paleogene Argentina
Fossils of Argentina
Paleogene Bolivia
Fossils of Bolivia
Fossil taxa described in 1895
Taxa named by Florentino Ameghino
Prehistoric placental genera
Golfo San Jorge Basin
Sarmiento Formation